Rowan Richards (born 8 July 1984) is a South African cricketer. He was included in the Northerns cricket team squad for the 2015 Africa T20 Cup. In August 2017, he was named in Stellenbosch Monarchs' squad for the first season of the T20 Global League. However, in October 2017, Cricket South Africa initially postponed the tournament until November 2018, with it being cancelled soon after.
Richards has continued his career in the sports industry and is currently a Professional Coach  at Queen's College Boys' High School

References

External links
 

1984 births
Living people
South African cricketers
Border cricketers
Northerns cricketers
Titans cricketers